Arthur Nicholas Tafoya (March 2, 1933 – March 24, 2018) was an American prelate of the Roman Catholic Church. He served as the third bishop of the Diocese of Pueblo in Colorado from 1980 to 2009.  His resignation as bishop was accepted by Pope Benedict XVI on October 15, 2009.

Biography
Arthur Tafoya was born on March 2, 1933, in Alameda, New Mexico.  He was ordained to the priesthood by Archbishop Edwin Byrne for the Archdiocese of Santa Fe on May 12, 1962.

Bishop of Pueblo 
On July 1, 1980, Tafoya was appointed the third bishop of the Diocese of Pueblo by Pope John Paul II. He received his episcopal consecration on September 10, 1980, from Archbishop James Casey, with Archbishop Robert Sanchez and Bishop Charles Buswell serving as co-consecrators.

Tafoya was an early critic of the 2003 to 2011 Iraq War, calling it "an unjust war...[that] sets a dangerous precedent and threatens the lives and well-being of people in our nation and world." During the 2004 U.S. presidential election, he expressed his opposition to denying communion to Catholic politicians who support abortion rights for women, saying that it was not the only issue voters should consider.

Retirement 
When Tafoya reached the mandatory retirement age of 75 for bishops, he submitted his letter of resignation as bishop of the Diocese of Pueblo to Benedict XVI.  The pope accepted his resignation on October 15, 2009.

Arthur Tafoya died in Albuquerque, New Mexico, on March 24, 2018, at age 85.

See also
 

 Catholic Church hierarchy
 Catholic Church in the United States
 Historical list of the Catholic bishops of the United States
 List of Catholic bishops of the United States
 Lists of patriarchs, archbishops, and bishops

References

External links

 Roman Catholic Diocese of Pueblo Official Site

Episcopal succession

1933 births
2018 deaths
People from Bernalillo County, New Mexico
Roman Catholic bishops of Pueblo
Roman Catholic Archdiocese of Santa Fe
20th-century Roman Catholic bishops in the United States
21st-century Roman Catholic bishops in the United States
Catholics from New Mexico